Flemish Heaven is a 2016 Belgian drama film directed by Peter Monsaert. It was screened in the Discovery section at the 2016 Toronto International Film Festival.

Plot
Monique runs a brothel together with her daughter Sylvie and some other girls. Eline is the six-year-old daughter of Sylvie. The brothel is a forbidden area for her. However, on her birthday she sneaks into the brothel and meets a travestite of whom only the voice is heard and some small parts of his clothes. He kidnaps Eline and sexually assaults her. She is found by Dirk, a bus driver. He is the father of Eline but this must remain a secret. That's why he is introduced as an uncle of Eline since she was born. The police starts an investigation but all tracks are a dead end. Both Sylvie and Dirk try to find the man who is responsible. Dirk and Eline meet a drunk Sinterklaas on 5 December. The man's behavior towards the children and the way Eline acts when she sees him, makes Dirk believe he is the wrongdoer. Eline tells Dirk the wrongdoer is named Robert. When Sinterklaas insinuates his name is Robert, Dirk kills him. He burns the car of the man and buries him under concrete on his farm. The police closes the investigation of Eline's case. Around Christmas a message is on national television regarding the disappeared man who is called Philippe. Eline associates this man with Sinterklaas and is happy he will not return. It is not revealed if Philippe is indeed the peadophile.  Dirk gets remorse and wants to hang himself just before the ending credits but his fate is unknown.

Cast
 Sara Vertongen as Sylvie
 Wim Willaert as Dirk
 Esra Vandenbussche as Eline
 Ingrid De Vos as Monique
 Isabelle van Hecke as Vanessa

References

External links
 

2016 films
2016 drama films
Belgian drama films
2010s Dutch-language films
2010s French-language films
Dutch-language Belgian films
French-language Belgian films